Epsilon (also titled Alien Visitor) is a 1995 Australian-Italian science fiction film that was directed by Rolf de Heer. It features Ullie Birve and Syd Brisbane (and Alethea McGrath, but in the 1997 expanded version only). The extended version of the film runs for 92 minutes and was distributed by Miramax in 1997.

Plot
An old woman tells two little girls a story around a campfire. A young female from the planet Epsilon is teleported to Earth by mistake. She arrives naked in a desert, but is found by a surveyor who gives her some clothes.  When she finds out she is on Earth, she is upset and informs the surveyor that other alien races consider humans to be failures that suffer from carelessness and greed and their habit of creating pollution is especially frowned upon. He at first thinks she is crazy, but she demonstrates the ability to transport herself and the surveyor instantly to any location and manipulate time. She takes him on a journey around the world, showing him the damage people have done to the environment. After several harsh lessons, like when she locates and cuts down his favorite tree, he begins to see her point of view.

Eventually, the two fall in love and she decides to stay on Earth. However, her people locate her and abruptly teleport her back to Epsilon, leaving her empty pile of clothes behind. Though saddened, he decides to honor her by working to stop pollution, starting by leaving his truck behind and walking back to civilization because of the air pollution it creates.

The old woman concludes her tale by saying the surveyor succeeded. Thanks to his efforts, air pollution was eliminated and people are able to see the stars at night.

Production
De Heer came up with the idea for the film while driving to dinner at a friend's house. Filming took over eight months.

References

External links
 
 
Epsilon at Oz Movies

1995 films
Nudity in film
1990s science fiction films
Films directed by Rolf de Heer
Films about extraterrestrial life
Time loop films
1990s English-language films